John Hutchins may refer to:
 John Hutchins (politician), member of the U.S. House of Representatives from Ohio
 John Hutchins (antiquary), Church of England clergyman and topographer
 W. John Hutchins, English linguist and information scientist
 J. Weston Hutchins, member of the Michigan Senate

See also
 Johnnie David Hutchins, United States Navy sailor and Medal of Honor recipient
 USS Johnnie Hutchins